Qareh Saqqal (also Romanized as Qareh Saqqāl; also known as Qareh Saqāl) is a village in Baruq Rural District, Baruq District, Miandoab County, West Azerbaijan Province, Iran. At the 2006 census, its population was 737, in 152 families.

References 

Populated places in Miandoab County